The 2014 Rugby Europe Women's Sevens Under 18 Championship was the inaugural Women's Sevens Under 18 Championship that was hosted in Enköping, Sweden. England won the Championship after defeating Wales in the Cup final and Ireland won the Plate.

Pool stages

Pool A

Belgium 0-31 Russia
Italy 0-26 Netherlands
Russia 26-0 Germany
Italy 14-0 Belgium
Netherlands 26-5 Germany
Russia 21-5 Italy
Netherlands 19-0 Belgium
Italy 5-15 Germany
Russia 0-10 Netherlands
Germany 21-7 Belgium

Pool B

Sweden 0-48 England
Ireland 19-7 Portugal
England 43-0 Wales
Ireland 31-5 Sweden
Portugal 5-17 Wales
England 43-0 Ireland
Portugal 17-17 Sweden
Ireland 5-12 Wales
England 45-0 Portugal
Wales 22-7 Sweden

Knockout stage

Bowl
9th place: Belgium 12-20 Sweden

Plate

Cup

References

Under 18
rugby sevens
International rugby union competitions hosted by Sweden